Morton High School is a public high school located in Morton, Texas United States. It is part of the Morton Independent School District, which is located in central Cochran County, and is classified as a 1A school by the UIL.

History
In 2015, the school was rated "Met Standard" by the Texas Education Agency.

Athletics
The Morton Indians compete in the following sports 

Baseball
Basketball
Cross Country
Football
Golf
Tennis
Track and Field

State Titles
Boys Basketball 
1972(2A), 1977(2A), 1983(2A), 1986(2A), 1987(2A), 2005(1A/D1)
Girls Basketball 
1987(2A)

 In 1987, both the boys and girls won state championships in basketball !!!

Notable alumni

Christopher Hester, Class of 1991, President and Founder of Kinnser Software. Ernst and Young Entrepreneur of the Year Award winner, 2016.

References

External links
Morton ISD

Public high schools in Texas
Schools in Cochran County, Texas